Words From the Duat: The Book of Anubis is the second album by Philadelphia, Pennsylvania rap group The Lost Children of Babylon released under the name of "The Lost Children Of Egypt". The album was released on Seventh Cathedral Recordings in 2003 and later Re-mastered and Re-released in 2006 on Babygrande Records. LCOB changed their name to "The Lost Children of Egypt" on request of Dr. Malachi Z. York. This name change reflects a concept change on the album, which is more focused on Egyptian philosophy and mythology.

Track listing

 Intro
 Distant Traveller
 Temples of Abydos
 Jesus Found in Egipt
 Souls of the Etherians
 Chosen Children
 Where Every Breath Is a Prayer
 Egyptian Intuition
 Valley of the Kings
 The rising force featuring Luminous Flux
 Missing Link
 Arabian Knights
 Warriors of Virtue
 Immortal Egipt
 Duel of the Fates

The Lost Children of Babylon albums
2005 albums
Babygrande Records albums